This is a chronological list of India Twenty-20 Wicketkeepers. Since 2006, eight cricketers have kept wicket for India in T20s. The first was M H M, who kept the wickets in India's first ever T20 match on 1 December 2006 against South Africa.

MS Dhoni holds the record most dismissals, stumpings and catches in T20Is as a wicket-keeper.

List

This list only includes players who have played as the designated keeper for a match. On occasions, another player may have stepped in to relieve the primary wicket-keeper due to injury or the keeper bowling.

Notes

See also

List of India Test wicket-keepers
List of India Twenty20 International cricketers
List of India Twenty20 International cricket records

References

External links
List of India Twenty-20 wicketkeepers

India
Indian
Indian
Wicket-keepers, Twenty-20
National